Titus Malachi Bramble (born 31 July 1981) is an English former professional footballer who played as a centre back.

Bramble played in the Premier League over thirteen consecutive seasons from 2000 and 2013, representing Ipswich Town, Newcastle United, Wigan Athletic and Sunderland. After being released by Sunderland in 2013, he spent several years in a coaching capacity at the Ipswich Town academy, with whom he began his career in 1998. He had a short spell as a player coach at Stowmarket Town in 2017.

At international level, he made 10 appearances for the England under-21s from 2000 and 2002.

Playing career

Ipswich Town
Born in Ipswich, Suffolk, Bramble started his career at home town club Ipswich Town. After making his debut in the 1998–99 season, Bramble went on to make 48 league appearances for the club, spending a brief period on loan at Colchester United over the 1999–2000 season. He scored four goals for Ipswich, with strikes against Sunderland in the league, Millwall and Coventry in the League Cup and Torpedo Moscow in the UEFA Cup.

Newcastle United
Bramble joined Newcastle in July 2002 for £6 million, vowing at the time to make himself indispensable to then manager Sir Bobby Robson.

At the end of the 2003–04 season, readers of the football e-mail newsletter The Fiver voted Bramble as the worst player of the year in the Premier League. Bramble scored a volleyed goal against league champions Chelsea on 8 May 2006 in a 1–0 victory that secured qualification for the Intertoto Cup.

On 10 August 2006, Bramble scored another vital goal for Newcastle in the UEFA Cup second qualifying round with a header against Latvian side FK Ventspils.

In December, Bramble was admitted into hospital after his injured calf swelled to double its normal size. On 31 January 2007, Bramble returned to action against Aston Villa in the centre of defence alongside Steven Taylor.

Wigan Athletic
Bramble signed for Wigan Athletic on a free transfer, agreeing to a three-year-deal on 4 June 2007. On 2 January 2008, he scored a goal at Anfield in a 1–1 draw against Liverpool – a 20-yard strike handing Wigan a late equaliser.

Bramble scored an equaliser against Newcastle United at St. James' Park, the match finishing in a 2–2 draw on 15 November 2008. His performances throughout the 2008–09 season picked him up four awards at the club's awards night, including 'Player of the Year' and 'Player's Player of the Year' for Wigan. On 14 July 2009, he extended his contract with Wigan until 2012.

Sunderland
On 23 July 2010, Bramble joined Sunderland for £1 million. He signed a three-year contract at the Stadium of Light, signed by his former manager at Wigan, Steve Bruce. He scored his first and only Sunderland goal in a 4–0 win against Stoke City on 18 September 2011. Bramble was one of seven players released by Sunderland at the end of the 2012–13 Premier League season. He played 51 games for Sunderland.

After being released by Sunderland he trained with West Ham United playing in their 6–2 pre-season defeat of Cork City. He returned to Ipswich in the pre-season to train, making his playing return in a game against Barnet but was not offered a contract.

Stowmarket Town
In August 2017, having been without a club for four years, Bramble joined Stowmarket Town, of the Eastern Counties Football League, as a player-coach.

Coaching career
Bramble was appointed Under-11 coach at Ipswich Town. In November 2014, he said it was a "disgrace" to apply the "Rooney Rule" to English football for compulsory ethnic minority management candidate consideration.

Personal life
One of his brothers, Tesfaye Bramble, is a footballer and has represented Montserrat at international level. The two brothers were arrested on suspicion of rape in September 2010 with Tesfaye being convicted of the offence, and Titus later being released without charge. On 28 September 2011, Bramble was temporarily suspended by Sunderland, after having been arrested on allegations of sexual assault and possession of a Class A drug. He was cleared of these charges on 31 May 2012.

Career statistics

Honours
Newcastle United
UEFA Intertoto Cup: 2006

Individual
Wigan Athletic Player of the Year: 2008–09

References

External links

1981 births
Living people
Sportspeople from Ipswich
Black British sportsmen
British people of Montserratian descent
English footballers
England under-21 international footballers
Association football defenders
Ipswich Town F.C. players
Colchester United F.C. players
Newcastle United F.C. players
Wigan Athletic F.C. players
Sunderland A.F.C. players
Stowmarket Town F.C. players
Premier League players
English Football League players
Eastern Counties Football League players
People acquitted of sex crimes
Ipswich Town F.C. non-playing staff
Association football coaches